The 1981 Dwars door België was the 36th edition of the Dwars door Vlaanderen cycle race and was held on 29 March 1981. The race started and finished in Waregem. The race was won by Frank Hoste.

General classification

References

1981
1981 in road cycling
1981 in Belgian sport
March 1981 sports events in Europe